"Ordinary People" is a song written by Jean-Marc Pisapia, and recorded by Canadian new wave group The Box. It was released in July 1987 as the second single from their album Closer Together.

Content and controversy
The song's theme created some controversy at the time its release due to its Cold War and political themes, and for combining the American and Soviet national anthems during the instrumental break.

Some music critics chafed at the idea that the song was recorded by a French-Canadian band, despite the song's opening and closing line referencing both the United States and Soviet Union.

According to Pisapia, the song's content labelled them a politically oriented band, which wasn't the case. He was inspired to write the song after hostile events taking place around the world at the time. Pisapia cleared up any hints that the song was politically motivated, stating that regardless of what side of the world they lived on, they are all ordinary people who don't care about political issues and stances and just want to live in peace.

References

1987 songs
1987 singles
The Box (band) songs
Alert Records singles
Anti-war songs
Songs about the military
Cold War in popular culture
Soviet Union–United States relations